Gottfried Langthaler (born 20 March 1953) is an Austrian weightlifter. He competed in the men's lightweight event at the 1976 Summer Olympics.

References

1953 births
Living people
Austrian male weightlifters
Olympic weightlifters of Austria
Weightlifters at the 1976 Summer Olympics
People from Freistadt District
Sportspeople from Upper Austria
20th-century Austrian people